Eretz Yisrael Shelanu (lit., Land of Israel is Ours) is a far-right religious party in Israel. Founded by Chabad Rabbi Shalom Dov Wolpo and Baruch Marzel on 11 November 2008, it seeks to prevent both the creation of a Palestinian state as well as the dismantling of Israeli settlements in the West Bank.

History 

In 2008, in anticipation of the 2009 Knesset elections, Wolpe and his party merged with Baruch Marzel's Jewish National Front. The Knesset list was topped by Wolpe, Marzel, and Israeli musician Ariel Zilber. In the weeks prior to the election, the joint list agreed to run as part of the National Union list, with Michael Ben-Ari, its representative, taking the 4th spot on the alliance's list. The Union won four seats, allowing Ben-Ari to enter the Knesset.

On 27 October 2010, violence broke out at the town of Umm al-Fahm between Eretz Yisrael Shelanu marchers and Arab counter-protesters.

In 2012, Ben-Ari and Aryeh Eldad of Hatikva, another member party of the National Union, announced their decision to leave the alliance and form Otzma LeYisrael. Ben-Ari left Eretz Yisrael Shelanu, and formed Otzma Yehudit and leading up to the 2013 Knesset elections, party leader Rabbi Shalom Dov Wolpo announced his support of HaBayit HaYehudi. Subsequently, leading Haredi rabbis Ya'akov Yosef and David Meir Drukman announced cessation of support of Eretz Yisrael Shelanu.

In April 2019 Knesset elections, Rafi Levengrond - father of a murder victim in Barkan shooting terror attack Kim Levengrond-Yehezkel, used the party as a 'Shelf Party' to run his own list for the Knesset. In the September 2019 Knesset elections Avi Yalou used the party as a 'shelf party' to run for the Knesset with his own list called "Tsedek" ("Justice" in Hebrew).

Leaders

Election results

References

2008 establishments in Israel
Orthodox Jewish political parties
Far-right political parties in Israel
Political parties established in 2008
Defunct political parties in Israel
Religious Zionist political parties in Israel
Conservative parties in Israel
Social conservative parties